If My Heart Had Wings is an eroge visual novel video game developed by Pulltop. It was released in Japan in 2012, and internationally by MoeNovel in 2013 with the sexual content removed.

Plot
The game focuses on Aoi who, having lost his direction in life, returns to his hometown of Kazegaura where a gentle breeze blows through the streets. On the hill lined with windmills, he meets a wheelchair-ridden girl named Kotori and together they watch a glider overhead in awe. With his childhood friend Ageha in town, and the super-repeat student Amane, they restore the soaring club in order to fulfill a dream: to soar in the skies.

The central theme of the story is loss, both physical and emotional.

Characters

Main characters

 (drama CD only)
Aoi Minase is the main protagonist. Following a cycling accident, he moves back to his home town of Kazegaura, where his mother has arranged for him to become the manager of Flying Fish Manor, a girls' dormitory.

Kotori is the main heroine of the visual novel. She has long, dark hair, and is considered to be beautiful, despite her somewhat childish personality. Following an accident that left her paralysed from the waist down, she transferred to Keifuu Academy. At the beginning of the story, she is on the verge of quitting school.

Aoi's childhood friend, Ageha is very popular amongst the students of Keifuu Academy. She is a member of the Robotics Club.

Amane, known as the "super repeat student", is revered as a genius by Keifuu Academy's students. At the start of the story, she is the sole member of the Soaring Club. Despite her intelligence, she is very clumsy and sometimes lacks common sense.

Asa is Yoru's elder twin sister, and a first-year at Keifuu Academy. She is bright and eager to learn about the process of building and flying gliders.

Yoru is Asa's younger twin sister. Unlike Asa, she shows no interest in gliders, and comes across as somewhat aloof.

Supporting characters

Tatsuya is around the same age as Amane and Hibari, and is friends with Aoi, Masatsugu and the Himegi family. He works at his family's factory, and helps the Soaring Club procure parts for their glider. 

Nicknamed Ma-bou by his childhood friends, Masatsugu is very enegetic and attached to his friends. After breaking up with his former girlfriend, he begins to take an interest in Akari.

Hibari is Kotori's older sister. She is gentle and cares deeply for her sister, however she can be quite forceful at times. She is opposed to the idea of Kotori flying a glider, as she thinks it would be too dangerous.

Hotaru is the younger of the two Himegi sisters. Compared to Ageha, she is much more quiet and reserved. She acts especially shy around Aoi.

Akari is the strict yet fair vice president of the Keifuu Academy student council. She is often the breaker of bad news when it comes to the Soaring Club, but she secretly roots for its success.

Kanako is a resident of Flying Fish Manor, and Aoi's senior. She often walks around the dormitory wearing nothing but her underwear, and often teases Aoi and the other residents.

Isuka is Amane Mochizuki's best friend. She was the one who originally proposed the idea of flying over the Morning Glory, but she never managed to do so due to an accident.

A teacher at Keifuu Academy, and the adviser to the Robotics Club. He is extremely strict, and seems determined to stop the Soaring Club from continuing its activities.

A duck who lives at Flying Fish Manor. As he has been there longer than anyone else, the residents of the dormitory refer to him as senpai.

Release
Pulltop officially released an adult trial version on 6 April 2012 followed by the full, limited edition version released on 25 May 2012. The visual novel received its English localization on 28 June 2013, with its age rating lowered to "all-ages": all sexual content was cut or edited. The game was released on Nintendo Switch on September 5, 2019.

Fan disc
A fan disc, entitled If My Heart Had Wings -Flight Diary- was released on 25 January 2013, featuring a collection of additional stories: both a prologue and an epilogue to the main story are included, and Kotori, Kanako and Hotaru received individual side stories. Furthermore, there are two additional routes for the Himegi sisters and the Kazato twins respectively. On 31 March 2016, Pulltop released Cruise Sign, a collection including both If My Heart Had Wings and Flight Diary, as well as an additional scenario for Akari Kumoi.

MoeNovel released an all-ages international version of Flight Diary on 27 February 2019. This version, as with If My Heart Had Wings, replaces all 18+ content with alternative scenes, or cuts them entirely. This release notably omits the Himegi sisters scenario, by virtue of it being composed almost entirely of erotic content. On 23 April of the same year, Akari's scenario was released as downloadable content for Flight Diary under the title New Wings: Akari.

Music
The opening theme for the visual novel is "Precious Wing" by Chata and the ending song is "Perfect Sky" by Haruka Shimotsuki. In its soundtrack, there are 29 songs in total.

Reception

If My Heart Had Wings has received largely positive reviews, with the PC release achieving a user rating of 8.8 on Metacritic. Critics praised the game's story, as well as the background art and sprite design, but criticised its use of 3D models.

Notes

References

External links
Kono Oozora ni, Tsubasa wo Hirogete official website 
Kono Oozora ni, Tsubasa wo Hirogete: Cruise Sign at 5pb.  
If My Heart Had Wings at MoeNovel

2012 video games
Android (operating system) games
IOS games
Eroge
Nintendo Switch games
PlayStation Vita games
Single-player video games
Video games developed in Japan
Video games featuring female protagonists
Visual novels
Windows games